Dendropsophus miyatai is a species of frog in the family Hylidae.
It is found in Brazil, Colombia, Ecuador, and Peru.
Its natural habitats are subtropical or tropical moist lowland forests, rivers, freshwater marshes, and intermittent freshwater marshes.
It is threatened by habitat loss.

References

miyatai
Amphibians of Brazil
Amphibians of Colombia
Amphibians of Ecuador
Amphibians of Peru
Amphibians described in 1990
Taxonomy articles created by Polbot